BSAT-4b, is a geostationary communications satellite ordered by Broadcasting Satellite System Corporation and designed and manufactured by SSL of Maxar Technologies on the SSL 1300 platform. It is expected to be stationed on the 110.0° East orbital latitude for direct television broadcasting of 4K and 8K Ultra HD television resolutions.

Satellite description 
BSAT-4b was designed and manufactured by SSL, a subsidiary of Maxar Technologies, on the SSL 1300 satellite bus for Broadcasting Satellite System Corporation.

It will have a single Ku-band payload with 24 transponders. It will cover Japan with 4K and 8K Ultra HD television satellite service.

History 
On 24 March 2018, B-SAT ordered the second of its fourth generation satellite from SSL, BSAT-4b. At the time, it was expected for a launch in June 2020. It was to serve as an backup to BSAT-4a, and enter service before the Tokyo 2020 Olympics.

On 19 April 2018, Arianespace was contracted for an Ariane 5 ECA launch service. On 1 July 2020, the satellite was delivered to French Guiana inside a container supplied by RUAG Space

Launch 
The satellite was launched on 15 August 2020 at 22:04 UTC.

References 

Communications satellites in geostationary orbit
Satellites using the SSL 1300 bus
Satellites of Japan
Ariane commercial payloads
Spacecraft launched in 2020